Works Volume 2 is the sixth studio album by Emerson, Lake & Palmer, released in 1977. Unlike Works Volume 1 (which consisted of three solo sides and one ensemble side), Works Volume 2 was a single album and it was seemingly a compilation of leftover tracks from other album sessions. While many derided the album for its apparent lack of focus, others praised it for showing a different side of the band than usual, with blues, bluegrass and jazz being very prominent as musical genres in this recording.

The remastered 2017 version of the album is expanded to a double-CD by the inclusion of the complete Works Live, an extended version of Emerson, Lake & Palmer in Concert.

Songs
"When the Apple Blossoms Bloom...", "Tiger in a Spotlight" and "Brain Salad Surgery" had been recorded at the 1973 sessions for the album Brain Salad Surgery but did not appear on it. Keith Emerson's cover of "Honky Tonk Train Blues" had been released as a single in 1976, reaching #21 in the UK singles chart.

Volume 2 also included a stripped-down version of Greg Lake's "I Believe in Father Christmas". An orchestral version of the song had previously been released as a solo Lake single in the UK in 1975 and became something of an annual Christmas standard there. It can also be heard on SiriusXM's seasonal Christmas channel Holly in the United States as well.

Reception

The album was not as commercially successful as the band's previous albums; it reached No. 20 in the UK and No. 37 in the US. Three tracks from the album were released as singles: "Tiger in a Spotlight", "Maple Leaf Rag", and "Watching Over You".

In a contemporary review, Robert Christgau of The Village Voice facetiously remarked that it is "news" when "the world's most overweening 'progressive' group" makes an album "less pretentious than its title", but questioned whether it is "rock and roll". In a retrospective review, AllMusic's David Ross Smith felt that it was "highly underrated" and wrote that the album's "brief pieces sustain interest; there really isn't a weak tune in the set." Paul Stump, in his 1997 History of Progressive Rock, commented that "Even Progressive militants have trouble defending Vol. 2, although 'When the Apple Blossoms Bloom in the Windmills of Your Mind' does have a perverse charm. 'Tiger in a Spotlight', however, a cheesy plod, shows just how low the band's collective inspiration had sunk."

The two Works albums were supported by North American tours which lasted from May 1977 to February 1978, spanning over 120 dates. Some early concerts in 1977 were performed with a hand-picked orchestra and choir, but the idea was shelved after 18 shows with the band due to budget constraints. The final concert with the orchestra and choir took place on 26 August 1977 at the Olympic Stadium in Montreal that was attended by an estimated 78,000 people, the highest attended Emerson, Lake & Palmer concert as a solo act. According to Lake on the Beyond the Beginning DVD documentary, the band lost around $3 million on the tour. Lake and Palmer blame Emerson for the loss as the use of an orchestra on tour was his idea.

Track listing

2001 bonus tracks

 Tiger in a Spotlight (Live, New Haven, 30 November 1977) 4:14
 Watching Over You (Live, New Haven, 30 November 1977) 4:30
 Show Me the Way to Go Home (Live, Indiana, 24 January 1978) 5:34

Singles
 "Watching Over You/Hallowed Be Thy Name" (UK release)
 "Tiger in a Spotlight/So Far to Fall" (German release)

Personnel

Emerson, Lake & Palmer

Keith Emerson - keyboards, piano, organ, synthesizers, accordion
Greg Lake - vocals, guitars, bass guitar
Carl Palmer - drums, percussion

Additional musicians

Ron Aspery - saxophone on "Bullfrog" (uncredited)
Colin Hodgkinson - bass guitar on "Bullfrog" (uncredited)
Graham Smith - Harmonica on "Watching Over You"

Charts

Weekly charts

Year-end charts

Certifications

References

Emerson, Lake & Palmer albums
1978 albums
Albums produced by Keith Emerson
Albums produced by Greg Lake
Albums produced by Peter Sinfield
Atlantic Records albums
Shout! Factory albums